Rank comparison chart of all air forces of European states.

Commissioned officer ranks
The rank insignia of commissioned officers.

See also
Air force officer rank insignia
Military rank
Comparative air force officer ranks of the Americas
Comparative air force officer ranks of Asia
Ranks and insignia of NATO air forces officers

Notes

References

Europe
Air force ranks
Military comparisons